Events in the year 2023 in Costa Rica.

Incumbents 

 President: Rodrigo Chaves Robles
 First Vice President: Stephan Brunner
 Second Vice President: Mary Munive

Events 

 Ongoing – COVID-19 pandemic in Costa Rica
 October 23 – November 6: Costa Rica at the 2023 Pan American Games

See also 

 2023 Atlantic hurricane season
 COVID-19 pandemic in North America

References 

 
2020s in Costa Rica
Years of the 21st century in Costa Rica
Costa Rica
Costa Rican